Central Platoon School was a platoon school,  where students were divided into groups (platoons) that switched between classroom studies and vocational as well as hands-on and recreational activities, in Brush, Colorado. It was designed by the Denver architectural firm Mountjoy & Frewen and has also been known as Central Elementary School. It was listed on the National Register of Historic Places in 2001.

The school is at 411 Clayton St. and occupies a complete block with an L-shaped plan. Mountjoy & Frewen was a partnership between Frederick E. Mountjoy and Frank W. Frewen, Jr.

A platoon school plan, also known as the Gary Plan, was devised by William Albert Wirt in 1907 in Gary, Indiana.  The plan divided the students into two groups, where one platoon would use the academic classrooms and the other platoon would be using shops, nature studies, the auditorium, the gymnasium, and other outdoor facilities.  This allowed all of the school facilities to be in use through the entire school day, and it also promoted the intellectual, manual, and recreational development of the students.

References

Schools in Colorado
National Register of Historic Places in Morgan County, Colorado
Renaissance Revival architecture in Colorado